X-Men is a home console video game produced by Sega for Sega Genesis in 1993, based on the adventures of the Marvel Comics superhero team, the X-Men. One or two players can play as any of four pre-chosen X-Men. X-Men was released in 1993 and was followed up by X-Men 2: Clone Wars.

Plot
The game takes place in the Danger Room, a training area for the X-Men inside the X-Mansion. A virus transmitted via satellite has infected the Danger Room, disabling control and safety limits. The X-Men must endure the unpredictable behavior of the Danger Room until the virus can be located and eliminated. Once the virus is eliminated, the X-Men discover that Magneto is behind the computer virus and the final stage involves a battle with him.

Gameplay
Gambit, Nightcrawler, Wolverine, and Cyclops are available to play. Each character can jump and use various unlimited weapons (i.e. punch, kick) and a superpower which had a usefulness limited by a mutant power bar similar to a life meter, making the player rely more on standard attacks. The mutant power bar would slowly regenerate when depleted and when switching characters in mid-game, would revert to the status of the next characters mutant power bar from the last use (characters yet to be used would start off with a standard full bar of mutant power).

Characters
Playable Characters
Wolverine: Uses retractable claws which enhance the strength of his basic punches and allows him to execute special mid-air attacks. As in other X-Men games, he possesses a healing factor that enables the character to recover from injury (i.e. replenish the life bar).

Gambit: Uses his trademark bo staff as a weapon. His charged cards track enemies.

Cyclops: Uses rebounding optic blasts.

Nightcrawler: Uses a teleportation ability which can skip many areas or transport a secondary character.

Other X-Men such as Storm, Rogue, Iceman, and Archangel can be called upon for support. Jean Grey also appears as support to pick up characters who fall. Sauron can be seen as cameo at the near end of first level, ironically helping the player inflight. There are several levels, most having boss fights with familiar X-Men villains.

Soundtrack
All of the music in the game was composed by Fletcher Beasley using the G.E.M.S. system (Genesis Emulation Music Software), which could communicate with the Yamaha 2612 FM synthesizer chip on the Sega Genesis and could be used to directly play back the sounds through the Genesis.

Reception
In 2011, IGN named the game in its "Fifteen Really, Really, Really Hard Games" list, citing "unfairly placed enemies, ridiculously annoying jumps and near-impossible-to-beat bosses", as well as the need to lightly press the Genesis' reset button in "Mojo's Crunch".

The game was ranked number 7 on GameTrailers' "Top 10 X-Men Games" list.

References

External links
 

1993 video games
Cooperative video games
Multiplayer and single-player video games
Sega Genesis games
Sega Genesis-only games
Sega video games
Superhero video games
Video games based on X-Men
Video games developed in the United States
Video games set in Antarctica